Brian Matthew Duensing (born February 22, 1983) is an American former professional baseball pitcher. He played in Major League Baseball (MLB) for the Minnesota Twins, Baltimore Orioles, and Chicago Cubs.

Amateur career

High school
Duensing went to Millard South High School in Omaha, Nebraska, where he earned second-team All-State honors in both his junior and senior years. His senior year he batted .429, and went 2–2 with a 3.78 earned run average on the mound. His combined record in two seasons of American Legion ball was 16–3 with 141 strikeouts. He had a 0.74 ERA, and a .522 batting average his second season.

College
Duensing was a college teammate of New York Yankees pitcher Joba Chamberlain and Kansas City Royals left fielder Alex Gordon at the University of Nebraska.

In  as a freshman, Duensing went 6–2 with a 4.73 ERA and 60 strikeouts (versus 25 walks) in 78 innings over 18 appearances (12 starts). He replaced Shane Komine in the starting rotation in Big 12 play while Komine was injured. He won 6 games in a row before losing to Richmond in the Super Regional. He helped the Huskers reach the 2002 College World Series throwing 11.2 consecutive scoreless innings in the NCAA Regional and Super Regional until allowing three runs in the 9th inning. He was an honorable-mention freshman all-American and was on the Big 12 all-freshman team.

His  season was cut short by of an elbow injury that required surgery. He had gone 3–0 over four starts with a 2.42 ERA and 24 strikeouts versus six walks. He threw 15 consecutive shutout innings in the Big 12 baseball tournament and helped the Huskers reach the 2005 College World Series 50 miles away.

Professional career

Minor League
Duensing was drafted by the Minnesota Twins in the 3rd round of the 2005 Major League Baseball draft. After he was drafted, he played for the rookie team Elizabethton Twins, going 4–3 with a 2.32 ERA and striking out 55. In , he went 5–10 in 28 games with a 3.49 ERA with 3 teams, the AA New Britain Rock Cats, A Fort Myers Miracle and A Beloit Snappers. In 2007, he played part of the season with the Rock Cats going 4–1. He was then promoted to the Triple-A Rochester Red Wings, where he went 11–5 with 3 complete games, 3.24 ERA and 86 strikeouts for the rest of the season.

USA Baseball Olympic Team
Duensing was 5–11 with a 4.32 ERA and 76 strikeouts in 23 starts with the Red Wings in  before ending his season in order to represent the United States at the 2008 Olympics. He posted Brian's Baseball Blog from Beijing to give fans personal insight to the games from a player's perspective.

In his only appearance, on August 16, Duensing pitched 3.1 scoreless innings in relief to earn the win for team USA against Canada. He gave up only one hit while striking out three.

Minnesota Twins
An injury to Twins pitcher Scott Baker opened a spot for Duensing on the Twins'  opening day roster. He made his major league debut on April 10, giving up a two-run home run to Carlos Quentin for his only earned runs in three innings pitched in the Twins' 12–5 victory over the Chicago White Sox. He was returned to Rochester on the 14th when Baker returned from the disabled list. While he was back in triple-A he went 4–6 with a 4.66 ERA in 13 starts at Rochester. The Twins recalled Duensing up on July 2, sending down Sean Henn to Rochester. The next day he made his second appearance of the season, relieving 3 innings, allowing one run on one hit while walking one and striking out two against the Detroit Tigers. On July 29, Duensing made his first major league start, against the Chicago White Sox, filling in for Francisco Liriano, who was scratched with inflammation in his left forearm. He went 5 innings, giving up 2 runs, which were both home runs, on 3 hits in a no decision. Duensing got his first major league win on August 22 against the Kansas City Royals. He won his following start going a career best 7 innings striking out 8 batters. Duensing started for the Twins in game 1 of the 2009 ALDS against CC Sabathia and the New York Yankees.

On July 21, 2010, Duensing was inserted into the starting rotation in place of Nick Blackburn. Blackburn was sent to the bullpen. On August 14, 2010, Duensing pitched his first career shutout vs. Trevor Cahill and the Oakland Athletics. After the Twins clinched the division title on September 20, 2010, Duensing was announced the third starter in the Twins' postseason rotation.  Duensing had an impressive 2010 season, pitching to a record of 10–3 with a 2.62 ERA.  He was given the third starting spot in the Twins' playoff rotation, but pitched poorly, going just 3.1 innings while giving up 5 runs.

Duensing was given the third spot in the starting rotation for the 2011 season.  While his season did have some bright moments, including his July shutout against the Tampa Bay Rays, Duensing's pitching did not live up to the potential that he had shown in the later parts of 2010.  He missed some starts with oblique strain, and ended the year with a 9–14 record and a 5.23 ERA.

Duensing split the 2012 season between the bullpen and the rotation, making 11 starts and 44 appearances out of the bullpen. He finished with an ERA of 5.12 and a 4–12 record.

In 2013, Duensing pitched exclusively out of the bullpen the whole year and had a 3.98 ERA in 73 games. He also notched his first career save during the season, finishing also with a 6–2 record. On August 9, 2013, Duensing won both games of a doubleheader against the Chicago White Sox. Duensing continued to pitch exclusively out of the bullpen in 2014 for the Twins, posting a 3–3 record, with a 3.31 ERA in 62 games.

On January 24, 2015, the Twins and Duensing agreed to a $2.7 million contract for 2015. That season, Duensing posted a 4–1 record and 4.25 ERA in 55 appearances out of the bullpen.

Kansas City Royals
On February 18, 2016, the Kansas City Royals signed Duensing to a minor league contract. He was released on March 28, and signed to re-signed to a minor league deal on April 1. He opted out on May 17, 2016.

Baltimore Orioles
On May 23, 2016, Duensing signed a minor league contract with the Baltimore Orioles organization. He was assigned to the Triple-A Norfolk Tides upon signing. On June 2, Duensing was selected to the active roster. Duensing was placed on the injured list on June 22 with left elbow inflammation, and rehabbed the injury with the Double-A Bowie Baysox and the rookie-level GCL Orioles before being activated on September 5. In 14 big league games with Baltimore, Duensing recorded a 4.05 ERA with 10 strikeouts.

Chicago Cubs
On December 2, 2016, Duensing signed a one-year, $2 million contract with the Chicago Cubs. In his 2017 campaign, he went 1–1 with a 2.74 ERA.

On January 17, 2018, Duensing re-signed with the Cubs on a two-year, $7 million contract. Duensing pitched to a career worst 7.65 ERA in  innings.

On March 24, 2019, Duensing was designated for assignment by Chicago. He was outrighted to the Triple-A Iowa Cubs on March 28. He was released by the Cubs on June 20 after posting a 6.92 ERA in 12 appearances with Iowa.

References

External links

Minor League Stats

1983 births
Living people
People from Marysville, Kansas
Baseball players from Kansas
Major League Baseball pitchers
Minnesota Twins players
Baltimore Orioles players
Chicago Cubs players
Nebraska Cornhuskers baseball players
Elizabethton Twins players
Beloit Snappers players
Fort Myers Miracle players
New Britain Rock Cats players
Rochester Red Wings players
Omaha Storm Chasers players
Norfolk Tides players
Iowa Cubs players
Baseball players at the 2008 Summer Olympics
Olympic bronze medalists for the United States in baseball
Medalists at the 2008 Summer Olympics
Team USA players